Raymond Roche (born 21 February 1957 in Ollioules) is a French former professional Grand Prix motorcycle road racer.

Motorcycle racing career
In 1981, he teamed up with Jean Lafond to win the FIM Endurance World Championship. His best year in Grand Prix racing was in 1984 when he finished third in the 500cc world championship behind Eddie Lawson and Randy Mamola. He is still only one of four native European riders from outside of the United Kingdom to have won the World Superbike Title.

Career statistics

Grand Prix motorcycle racing

Races by year
(key) (Races in bold indicate pole position) (Races in italics indicate fastest lap)

Superbike World Championship

Races by year
(key) (Races in bold indicate pole position) (Races in italics indicate fastest lap)

References

1957 births
Living people
Sportspeople from Var (department)
French motorcycle racers
500cc World Championship riders
350cc World Championship riders
250cc World Championship riders
Superbike World Championship riders
People from Ollioules